Fuquay-Varina is a town in southern Wake County, North Carolina, United States, lying south of Holly Springs and southwest of Garner, and north of the Harnett County town of Angier and west of the unincorporated community of Willow Springs. The population was 17,937 at the 2010 census, and estimated at 36,736 as of July 2021. The hyphenated name attests to the town's history as two separate towns.  Fuquay Springs and Varina merged in 1963 to create the modern town. Economically, the town initially grew due to tobacco trade and agriculture, but has seen recent population growth and real estate development due to its proximity to Research Triangle Park.

Geography
Fuquay-Varina is located at  (35.591969, -78.788746).

Fuquay-Varina is located in the northeast central region of North Carolina, where the North American Piedmont and Atlantic Coastal Plain regions meet. This area is known as the "Fall Line" because it marks the elevation inland at which waterfalls begin to appear in creeks and rivers. Its central Piedmont location situates Fuquay-Varina approximately three hours west of Atlantic Beach by car and four hours east of the Great Smoky Mountains.

Climate
Fuquay-Varina enjoys a moderate subtropical climate, with moderate temperatures in the spring, fall, and winter. Summers are typically hot with high humidity. Winter highs generally range in the low 50s°F (10 to 13 °C) with lows in the low-to-mid 30s°F (-2 to 2 °C), although an occasional 60 °F (15 °C) or warmer winter day may occur. Spring and fall days usually reach the low-to-mid 70s°F (low 20s°C), with lows at night in the lower 50s°F (10 to 14 °C). Summer daytime highs often reach the upper 80s to low 90s°F (29 to 35 °C). The rainiest month is July.

History

Early history

Frenchman William Fuquay first settled in the small farming town of Sippihaw, named for the original Native American tribe that inhabited the area. Although there is no history of a tribe called Sippihaw, there are historical accounts in the area of a tribe called Susippihaw. Around 1858, while plowing the fields of the family tobacco farm, Stephen Fuquay, son of William, discovered a spring. Originally the spring was used solely for drinking water. Stephen soon came to the conclusion that the mineral water flowing from the springs had healing properties.  As word spread, locals began to help the springs establish this reputation, which brought residents from neighboring communities and counties to its waters. The springs were eventually walled in to better serve the tourists coming to the area by road or rail. In 1860, Fuquay sold the springs to a group of local investors who formed the Chalybeate Springs Company to market the attraction and its waters.

At that time another Sippihaw resident, J. D. "Squire" Ballentine, was returning home from the Civil War. Ballentine had been the town's schoolmaster before going off to fight for the Confederate Army. During his tour of duty, he had received letters from one of many southern ladies who wrote to the troops to improve their morale. Originally signing her name "Varina", perhaps an homage to the wife of Jefferson Davis, Virginia Avery would later meet and fall in love with Ballentine. He continued to call her Varina throughout their life together. When he became the first postmaster at the new post office in town in 1880, he named it "Varina" in her honor. A community grew just south of the springs, near the post office and the couple's Varina Mercantile Company general store. In time, it adopted the same name. Ballentine's business success allowed him to construct the Ballentine Spence House in 1910, the first house to have plumbing and electricity in the area. This house, a local historic landmark, still stands today.

Growth around the start of the 20th century

The Fuquay Mineral Spring's popularity grew in the 1890s and around the start of the 20th century as local businessman John Mills developed the idea to offer "Moonlight Excursions" to the springs. He fitted flat rail cars with seats and offered nighttime train trips to southern Wake County from Raleigh. As more guests came to the springs to "take the waters", a group of small hotels sprung up in town, along with restaurants, barbecue stands, and a dance pavilion with a player piano. The town became a tourist destination and was the site of special celebrations on Fourths of July and Easter Mondays. During these events, residents of Raleigh would take the train down to watch the accompanying baseball games and participate in the dances and celebrations. Hotels like the Ben Wiley Hotel (now called the Fuquay Mineral Spring Inn & Garden) catered to the out-of-towners and became as much a center of town life as the springs. In 1902, Sippihaw was renamed "Fuquay Springs" in honor of its founding family and was officially incorporated in 1909.

When it was incorporated, the new Fuquay Springs town limits included the core of the neighboring town of Varina, consisting of its business district and the rail junction of the Cape Fear and Northern Railway and the Norfolk Southern Railway. But Varina reestablished itself the following year when the Varina Union Station was erected and a new post office was created, spurred by the lobbying of Ballentine. Four years later, the Bank of Varina was established, competing directly with the Bank of Fuquay (now Fidelity Bank). Several warehouses for the growing tobacco business were built in town over the next few years, capitalizing on the railroad connections. Another supply store and a knitting factory followed. As Varina came into its own as a hub for area agriculture, the Fuquay Springs Corporation was formed and began bottling and selling mineral water from the springs commercially. Area businesses continued to develop and, in 1927, U.S. Route 401 was paved through town, shortening travel times to Raleigh and nearby communities.

Unification and the present

By this time, Fuquay Springs and Varina had become major trading hubs for southern Wake County as well as neighboring Harnett and Johnston counties. Yet improvements to automobiles and area roads caused a decline in tourism at the springs. Rather than visiting the springs, residents in the region chose to visit the coast as travel times decreased. During this time, however, the tobacco industry continued to drive the area economy, with five warehouses, a cotton buyer, and fifteen stores established by the end of the 1920s. The shared emphasis on agricultural and industrial growth brought the towns to a shared vision, and as their residents worked, played, and attended church together, the towns merged into Fuquay-Varina in 1963.

While development in the area today includes numerous residential communities and commercial sites along the major roadways into town, many of the older structures from its past remain within the town limits. The Victorian, Craftsman, and Colonial Revival homes constructed in the late 19th century and early 20th century are contributing structures to the Fuquay Springs Historic District, while the downtown shops and businesses are part of the Varina Commercial Historic District. Area landmarks located in these districts include the Ben-Wiley Hotel, the Ballentine-Spence House, and the Dr. Wiley S. Cozart House, built across the street from the springs by the original owner and proprietor of the Ben Wiley. The springs are now contained in a small park developed on the site in 1945 which was handed over to the town in 1998 to maintain as a historic park.  Lexie McLean owned and operated McLean's Grocery on Academy Street for many years. McLean was a community leader and considered a major factor in the growth and development of the Fuquay-Varina area. Edward N. Farnell was the principal of the Fuquay Spring High School from 1952 through 1967. Farnell was an important community leader and educator; many of his students went on to become community and state leaders.

From 1970 to 2000, the population more than doubled, growing from 3,576 residents to 7,898. The population more than doubled again between 2000 and 2010, growing to 17,937 at the 2010 census. According to the NC State Data Center, Fuquay-Varina grew 23% from 2000 to 2003, making it the 26th fastest growing community in the state and the 11th fastest for those with populations over 5,000.

The mayor of Fuquay-Varina is Blake Massengill, who was elected in 2021 with 50% of the vote over Commissioner Bill Harris. Prior to being elected as mayor, Blake served as Mayor Pro-Tem for six years. The new Mayor Pro-Tem replacing Massengill is Commissioner Larry Smith.

Fuquay-Varina is also the former hometown of Internet personalities Rhett McLaughlin and Link Neal, who moved their studio there in 2010, as well as Link who until then lived in Apex, North Carolina.

In addition to the Ben-Wiley Hotel, Fuquay Springs Historic District, and Varina Commercial Historic District, the Fuquay Mineral Spring, Fuquay Springs High School, Fuquay Springs Teacherage, Fuquay-Varina Woman's Club Clubhouse, J. Beale Johnson House, Kemp B. Johnson House, Jones-Johnson-Ballentine Historic District, and Wayland H. and Mamie Burt Stevens House are listed on the National Register of Historic Places.

Demographics

2020 census

As of the 2020 United States census, there were 34,152 people, 9,494 households, and 7,150 families residing in the town.

2000 census
As of the census of 2000, there were 7,898 people, 3,122 households, and 2,126 families residing in the town. The population density was 1,156.0 people per square mile (446.5/km2). There were 3,375 housing units at an average density of 494.0 per square mile (190.8/km2). The racial composition of the town was: 70.63% White, 24.40% Black or African American, 7.38% Hispanic or Latino American, 0.48% Asian American, 0.41% Native American, 0.02% Native Hawaiian or Other Pacific Islander, 2.94% some other race, and 1.15% two or more races.

There were 3,122 households, out of which 36.8% had children under the age of 18 living with them, 48.8% were married couples living together, 15.5% had a female householder with no husband present, and 31.9% were non-families. 26.3% of all households were made up of individuals, and 10.8% had someone living alone who was 65 years of age or older. The average household size was 2.48 and the average family size was 2.99.

In the town, the population was spread out, with 27.3% under the age of 18, 8.2% from 18 to 24, 35.2% from 25 to 44, 16.3% from 45 to 64, and 13.0% who were 65 years of age or older. The median age was 33 years. For every 100 females, there were 89.0 males. For every 100 females age 18 and over, there were 84.5 males.

The median income for a household in the town was $42,903, and the median income for a family was $49,531. Males had a median income of $35,497 versus $28,551 for females. The per capita income for the town was $20,268. About 9.0% of families and 11.1% of the population were below the poverty line, including 15.3% of those under age 18 and 11.5% of those age 65 or over.

Education
The town is served by seven public schools, administered by the Wake County Public School System. Public schools include Ballentine Elementary School, Fuquay-Varina Elementary School, Lincoln Heights Elementary School, Herbert Akins Road Elementary, Fuquay-Varina Middle School, Fuquay-Varina High School, and South Lakes Elementary School. Southern Wake Academy, a publicly funded charter school serving grades 6 through 12, is also located in Fuquay-Varina. Hilltop Christian School is a private school located in the town.

The area is served by Wake Technical Community College, which is located between Fuquay-Varina and Raleigh. The 2007 enrollment was approximately 57,000 and was projected to grow to 78,000 by 2015.

Transportation

Roads
Two state routes and one U.S. route run through Fuquay Varina.  All three routes occupy part of Main Street in the main business district in town, and each goes in a different direction outside of the main business district.

 NC 42 enters the town from the west, after traveling through a large sparsely populated rural area including the unincorporated community of Duncan.  The next sizable settlement on NC 42 is Sanford, about 25 miles away.  After entering the town, it follows Academy Street, which marks the central east–west street of the town grid system.  After meeting Main Street, NC 42 leaves Academy Street and joins US 401 along North Main Street.  After meeting NC 55 at Broad Street just south of Old Varina, the three share North Main Street before NC 55 and NC 42 leave US 401 at the northeastern corner of town.  The two routes share pavement only for a few dozen yards before NC 42 splits off in an eastbound direction towards Willow Springs and Cleveland in Johnston County.
 NC 55 enters the town from the northwest, entering the town from Holly Springs and forming the main route through the Varina Commercial Historic District, one of the former towns that merged to make Fuquay-Varina.  After meeting the other two routes, the three share North Main Street before NC 55 and NC 42 leave US 401 at the northeastern corner of town.  The two routes share pavement only for a few dozen yards before NC 55 splits to the south and heads towards the unincorporated community of Kennebec and from then on to Angier.
US 401 enters the town from the south, after traveling through northern Harnett County from Lillington.  Forming the main thoroughfare through the Fuquay Springs Historic District, one of the former towns that merged to make Fuquay Varina, following South Main Street.  After meeting NC 42 at Academy Street and NC 55, the three routes follow North Main Street through town before NC 42 and NC 55 leave towards the southeast, and US 401 heads northeast towards Garner.

Public transport
 Air: Raleigh-Durham International Airport is located in northwestern Wake county on I-40.
 Rail: Fuquay-Varina is not served directly by passenger trains. Amtrak serves the nearby municipalities of Cary and Raleigh.
 Local bus: The Triangle Transit Authority operates buses that serve the region and connect to municipal bus systems in Raleigh, Durham, and Chapel Hill.

Parks and recreation

The town is served by the following parks:
 Fuquay Mineral Spring Park - This park is the site of the natural spring around which the Fuquay Springs community developed. The facility includes picnic tables, a footbridge, restored spring house, park benches, granite historical marker, and memorial brick path.
 South Park - Facilities include a concession/scorekeeper building, scorekeeper booth, two baseball fields, one multi-purpose field, two soccer fields, multi-purpose area, community center, administrative offices, a picnic shelter, playground units, a miniature water park for children, grilling area, and a walking track.
 Falcon Park - Facilities include a youth baseball/softball field, picnic shelter, playground, charcoal grill area, concession stand, sand volleyball court and a gymnasium.
 Action Park - Facilities include two youth softball/baseball fields, Batting cages, one multipurpose field (softball, baseball, football, soccer), four lighted tennis courts, and a playground.
 Carroll Howard Johnson Environmental Education Park - The park has nature trails and free teaching kits available for use. Lesson plans and supplies for grades K-12  are included in each kit and kits are available to be checked out from the community center. Facilities include 1.5 -  of interpretive walking trails, overlooks, bridges, outdoor classroom, restrooms, and a picnic pavilion with tables.
 Ballentine School Park - Facilities include three youth baseball/softball fields and one multi-purpose field.
 Library Park - Facilities include a picnic shelter, playground area, and a charcoal grilling area.
 Honeycutt Road Park - Facilities include two lighted soccer fields, one lighted multi-purpose field, two tennis courts, playground, concession stand with restrooms, paved walking track, and paved parking areas.
 Kinton Soccer Field - Youth soccer field
 Ransdell Soccer Field - Youth soccer field
 Fleming Loop Soccer Complex - Youth soccer fields
 Lawrence Street Park - Soccer Field
 Herbert Akins Park - Three soccer fields Great for tournaments or picnics
 Banks Road Park - Two soccer fields and a baseball/softball field
Splash Pad -  6,000 square foot pentagon shaped pad features multiple jets of streaming water from more than 35 water features. Free for residents but must have a Resident Splash Pad card which can be picked up at the Community Center during regular business hours (Monday-Friday 8 am-9 pm; Saturday 8 am-5 pm).

Government 
Fuquay-Varina is governed by a council-manager form of government. The current mayor is Blake Massengill while the town manager is Adam Mitchell. The Town Board serves as the main legislative body, whose members,  called commissioners, are all elected at-large for staggered four-year terms, with one member serving as mayor pro ten for a two-year term. The mayor is elected at-large for a two-year term, and serves as chairman of the board. The mayor and commissioners are elected on a nonpartisan basis.

 Blake Massengill, Mayor (2021 - )
 Larry Smith, Mayor Pro-Tem (2019 - )
 Marilyn Gardner, Commissioner (2015 - )
 Bill Harris, Commissioner (1987 - )
 Bryan Haynes, Commissioner (2021 - )
 Tracy Watson, Commissioner (2021 - )

Notable people
 Lynton Y. Ballentine, North Carolina dairyman, farmer and politician
 Curley Bridges (1934–2014), was an American electric blues, rock and roll, and rhythm and blues singer, pianist and songwriter
 Andre Bowden, Arena Football League fullback and linebacker
 Beverly Buchanan, African-American artist whose works include painting, sculpture, video, and land art
 Connor Donovan, professional soccer player
 Franklin Taylor Dupree Jr., Federal judge who lived in Fuquay-Varina while he presided over the Jeffrey MacDonald murder trial
 Count Grog, professional wrestling manager and promoter
 C.J. Hunter, US Olympic Shot Putter
 Rhett and Link, Internetainers (a portmanteau of the words "Internet" and "entertainers") who host Good Mythical Morning
 Katharine Stinson, aeronautical engineer and the Federal Aviation Administration's first female engineer

References

External links

 Town of Fuquay-Varina official website
 Fuquay-Varina Chamber of Commerce
 Fuquay-Varina Independent (local newspaper)
 Fuquay-Varina Revitalization Association
 Fuquay-Varina Economic Development Commission
Today in the Quay (local online news)
 Suburban Living Magazine (local magazine)

 
Towns in North Carolina
Research Triangle
Towns in Wake County, North Carolina
1909 establishments in North Carolina